The women's 1000 metres race of the 2013–14 ISU Speed Skating World Cup 1, arranged in the Olympic Oval, in Calgary, Alberta, Canada, was held on 10 November 2013.

Heather Richardson of the United States won, while Lotte van Beek of the Netherlands came second, and Brittany Bowe of the United States came third. Kim Hyun-yung of South Korea won Division B on a new world record for girls, 1:15.18.

Results
The race took place on Sunday, 10 November, with Division A scheduled in the morning session, at 11:30, and Division B scheduled in the afternoon session, at 16:26.

Division A

Division B

References

Women 1000
1